Mene rhombea is an extinct perciform fish belonging to the family Menidae. During the Middle Eocene (Lutetian epoch), about 48 to 40 mya, these fishes lived in the Tethys Ocean, a large tropical sea in the area corresponding to the current Mediterranean. This ocean was extended between the continents of Gondwana and Laurasia.  At this time, where Monte Bolca is today, M. rhombea, and its relative, M. oblonga, lived in a tropical lagoon.

Description
Mene rhombea had a laterally compressed body, very long and slim pelvic fins and a wide triangular tail fin. As suggested by their fossils' small, upturned mouths, and by comparison of its living relative, as Mene maculata, fishes of this species were planktivore.  The species shows close affinities with contemporary species inhabiting the coral reef environment of the Indo-Pacific warm seas.

Distribution
Their greatly valued fossils comes from the laggerstat Monte Bolca, about 30 kilometres north-east of Verona, Italy.

Gallery

External links
 Biolib
 ZipcodeZoo
 Museo di Geologia e Paleontologia
 Weigert-Fossil

Prehistoric perciformes
Eocene fish
Menidae
Prehistoric life of Europe
Fossil taxa described in 1796